Darvaza (from , literally "gate" ultimately from  in Sanskrit) is a rural council (village council) in Ak bugdaý District, Ahal Province, Turkmenistan of about 350 inhabitants, located in the middle of the Karakum Desert, about 260 km north of Ashgabat. The rural council consists of three separate villages: Aeroport (the administrative center), Ataguýy, and Böri.

Darvaza's inhabitants are mostly Turkmen of the Teke tribe, preserving a semi-nomadic lifestyle.
In 2004 the village was disbanded following the order of the President of Turkmenistan, Saparmurat Niyazov, because "it was an unpleasant sight for tourists."

Transportation
The Darvaza area is served by the Ashgabat-Dashoguz Automobile Highway and the Içoguz station on the Trans-Karakum Railway.  A landing strip for small cargo aircraft is located at the village of Aeroport.

Darvaza gas crater 

The Darvaza area is rich in natural gas. While drilling in 1971, Soviet geologists tapped into a cavern filled with natural gas. The fire may have originated from a local Soviet decision to avoid poisonous gas discharge, by burning off the gas, and while geologists had hoped the fire would consume the fuel in a few days, the gas is still burning fifty years later.  

Locals have named the crater the "Door to Hell".

See also 
 Darvaza gas crater, the main tourist attraction in the area.
 Energy policy of the Soviet Union
 Eternal Flame Falls
 List of cities, towns and villages in Turkmenistan
 Mine fire
 Sidoarjo mud flow
 Erbent, a nearby town that is also in the Karakum Desert.

References

External links

 Photos from the Darvaza Gas Crater or "Gates of Hell"
 Tourist information for Darvaza
 
 Pictures and YouTube link
 Au bord du cratère de Darvaza

Populated places in Ahal Region